Route Y-50 (9-CH) is a primary regional road in Magallanes Province, southernmost Chile. The road runs from Chile Route 9 to Estancia Río Verde on the shores of Skyring Sound.

References

Roads in Chile
Transport in Magallanes Region